Local elections was held in Lipa City on May 9, 2016 within the Philippine general election.  The voters will elect candidates for the elective local posts in the city: the mayor, vice mayor, the congressman (which will represent Batangas' sixth district which is composed of just the city), two provincial board members, and the 12 members of its city council.

Unlike in the 2013 elections, voters of the city will be electing its first member in the House of Representatives, two representatives to the Batangas provincial board, and two more councilors thus bringing the councilors' total to 12 as opposed to the previous 10.

Background

Mayoral and vice mayoral elections
Incumbent mayor Meynardo Sabili is running for his third and final term as Mayor of the City of Lipa. He assumed the mayorship in 2010, defeating then-incumbent and former 4th District representative Oscar Gozos. This is despite Sabili's disqualification to run because of residency dispute. Sabili, a former provincial board member used to be a registered voter Barangay Sico 1, San Juan, Batangas and transferred to Barangay Pinagtong-Ulan, Lipa City. However, the Supreme Court annulled and dismissed the Commission on Elections' ruling on Sabili's cancellation of his certificate of candidacy. He was initially known to be running under National Unity Party (NUP), with three-term councilor Raul Montealto as his running mate.  (Montealto was barangay captain of Bugtong na Pulo before elected as councilor in 2007.).  However, NUP withdrew their nomination of Team Sabili due to its membership of the Koalisyong Matuwid na Daan (known as Koalisyon ng Daang Matuwid), where the party has to endorse Liberal Party-nominated candidates even under the local level; therefore Sabili and his team will run as independents; hence Sabili's coalition was supported by Partido Galing at Puso of Poe-Escudero tandem, while Mendoza's coalition was supported by the aforementioned Liberal coalition (where Sabili's last party's nominee in the 2013 mid-term elections).

His opponent is Fiscal Edgardo "Gary" Mendoza, who is running under the Liberal Party, the party of incumbent governor and former city mayor Vilma Santos-Recto. His running mate is incumbent vice mayor Eric Africa. Africa was elected councilor from 1998 to 2007 then from 2010 until he was elected vice mayor in 2013.

Congressional election
Incumbent governor and former mayor Vilma Santos-Recto, who is barred for another term decided to run as for a seat at the new 6th legislative district of Batangas, which only comprises the City of Lipa. The city was a part of the 4th District of Batangas from 1987. This despite of the call of supporters to run for a much higher position, especially as the vice presidential candidate of Mar Roxas. Recto became its first female city mayor from 1998 until she was elected first female governor of Batangas in 2007. Her main opponent is Bernadette Sabili, wife of Mayor Meynard Sabili. Sabili first ran as Representative of the 4th District of Batangas, but was defeated by incumbent representative Mark Llandro Mendoza. However, NUP withdrew her nomination due to its membership of the Koalisyong Matuwid na Daan, where the party has to endorse Liberal Party-nominated candidates even under the local level; therefore Sabili will run as independent.

Candidates

District representative

Provincial Board Members

|-

|-

|-

|-

Mayor
Incumbent Mayor Meynardo Sabili is running for reelection. His opponent is fiscal Edgardo Mendoza.

Vice mayor
Incumbent Eric Africa is running for reelection. His opponent is incumbent councilor Raul Montealto.

Councilors

Team Recto-Mendoza-Africa

Team Sabili-Montealto

References

2016 Philippine local elections
Elections in Lipa
2016 elections in Calabarzon